Alejandra Carbone (born 9 December 1975) is an Argentine foil fencer. She competed at the 1996, 2000 and 2004 Summer Olympics.

References

External links
 

1975 births
Living people
Argentine female foil fencers
Olympic fencers of Argentina
Fencers at the 1996 Summer Olympics
Fencers at the 2000 Summer Olympics
Fencers at the 2004 Summer Olympics
Fencers from Buenos Aires
Pan American Games medalists in fencing
Pan American Games bronze medalists for Argentina
South American Games bronze medalists for Argentina
South American Games medalists in fencing
Fencers at the 1995 Pan American Games
Competitors at the 2010 South American Games
Medalists at the 1995 Pan American Games
20th-century Argentine women
21st-century Argentine women